Dies the Fire is a 2004 alternate history and post-apocalyptic novel written by S. M. Stirling. It is the first installment of the Emberverse series and is a spin-off from S. M. Stirling's Nantucket series in which the Massachusetts island of Nantucket is thrown back in time from March 17, 1998 to the Bronze Age.

In Dies the Fire, S. M. Stirling chronicles two groups during "The Change", a mysterious worldwide event suddenly alters physical laws so electricity, gunpowder, and most other forms of high-energy-density technology no longer work. As a result of this, modern civilization comes crashing down.

Setting
Dies the Fire is a fantasy novel set in post-apocalyptic Oregon and Idaho. After an unknown phenomenon disables most forms of modern technology such as electricity, high-pressure steam-power, combustion, computers, electronics, guns, car and jet engines, and batteries, people quickly adapt, relying on swords and bows. Many people starve, while others continue robbing, raping, and pillaging as before the transition. Many resort to cannibalism. During this collapse, rural folks form isolated farming communities, while urbanites are enslaved by warlords. The book follows the Bearkiller Outfit and the Clan Mackenzie as they struggle to survive, while attempting to understand the mystery of 'what made the lights go out?' in this post-apocalyptic world.

Plot

The Bearkillers
Mike Havel is a former United States Marine, a veteran of the Persian Gulf War, and bush pilot. On March 17, 1998, at 6:15 pm PST, Havel is flying over the Bitterroot Mountain Range in Idaho during a mysterious event that become known as "The Change". His passengers are business owners Kenneth and Mary Larsson and their three teenage children, Erik, Signe, and Astrid. After the plane's engine and electronics are disabled, Mike makes an emergency landing. Everyone survives, although Mary is injured.

The party hikes across mountains to a ranger cabin. Mike and Erik hike out onto the highway in hopes of finding help. After they get to the highway, they encounter white separatist survivalists who have Will Hutton (who is black) and his family prisoners. After a tense conversation with the survivalists, Mike and Erik attack them. During the battle, they manage draw the survivalists away, unfortunately leading them up the trail to the cabin with the rest of the Larsson family. Mike and Erik pursue them catching up to them after they re-captured Will and control the cabin. Mike and Erik attack the survivalists to free Will and the Larsson family. Prior to the fight, the survivalists murdered Mary Larson and were about to rape Astrid and Signe. All three survivalists are killed.

The Huttons, equine breeders and trainers, join Mike's band. The group elects Mike as their leader, then the group decides to travel from Idaho to 'Larsdalen', the Larsson estate in the Willamette Valley region of Oregon.  Along the way, Astrid injures a black bear with an arrow from her bow, provoking it into attacking Mike. It injures Mike, then they kill it. The event gives the group their name – the Bearkillers.

On the journey, the Bearkillers recruit other survivors. The Bearkillers are hired as mercenaries by a group near a Nez Perce Indian Reservation to deal with a cannibal band snatching people along the road to Lewiston. The Bearkillers eliminate the cannibals and rescue their prisoners.

Signe is attracted to Mike, although she keeps him at arm's length, haunted by memories of her near-rape at the hands of the survivalists.

After their mercenary army is larger, Mike takes two companions to scout west. In Portland, Mike meets Norman Arminger, leader of the Portland Protective Association. Arminger, a university professor of medieval history and member of the Society for Creative Anachronism (SCA), is re-instating feudalism by recruiting gang members and former SCA members, then eliminating anybody he does not need. Arminger offers the Bearkillers positions as Protectorate nobles, but Mike declines.

After leaving Portland, Mike and his companions rescue Juniper Mackenzie and her friends from another band of cannibals. Mike and Juniper have an instant attraction and have unprotected sex that night before the two groups separate; Juniper becomes pregnant.

After Mike and his companions return to their group, the Bearkillers are hired by Sheriff Woburn to fight "Duke Iron Rod"; he is later revealed to be in league with Arminger to break the people of the Camas Prairie region and bring them under protectorate rule. The Bearkillers ambush one of Iron Rod's raiding parties. While they are away, a traitor helps a second group enter and attack the Bearkillers' camp. In the fighting, Ken Larsson loses his left hand and eye, but Mike and his men return in time to rout the attackers and capture Iron Rod. After reaching Larsdalen, the Bearkillers with the Clan Mackenzie and some ranchers raid a Protectorate castle Arminger constructed to control an important route (Highway 20) over the Cascades.

After the battle, Mike and Signe become engaged.

Clan Mackenzie
The parallel story of the formation of Clan Mackenzie begins with Juniper Mackenzie, a folk-singer and Wiccan priestess. Juniper is performing in a restaurant in Corvallis during The Change. She, along with her deaf teenage daughter Eilir, and their friend Dennis Martin, assist survivors of an airliner crash in the city. After looters realize guns no longer work, they attack a former government agent. Dennis and Juniper go to help and Juniper kills one. The others flee, and one of them, Eddie Liu, vows to avenge his dead friend. Liu becomes one of Arminger's barons.

Juniper, Dennis, and Eilir gather supplies, collect Juniper's horses and wagon from a friend's farm, then head for Juniper's cabin in central Oregon. On the way, refugees attack them, and Eilir shoots a woman with her bow. The woman's companions flee, but the wounded woman and her son join the group. Some of Juniper's coven members go to Juniper's cabin after rescuing children on a bus.

Juniper's Clan farm the land. While hunting, Juniper and Dennis rescue Sam Aylward, a former British army special forces soldier, superb archer and bowyer after he was entangled in an accidental fall.

Juniper leads scouts around the area. They arrive in Corvallis, Oregon, and discover that Oregon State University professors have taken over the town. They escape the trap but are then ambushed by cannibals. Mike and his Bearkillers save them.  Juniper and Mike have unprotected sex; Juniper gets pregnant.

The Clan has a successful harvest, but nearby Sutterdown is occupied by Protectorate troopers.  Juniper leads the Clan against the troopers, and drives them out of the town.

Sam Aylward leads a group of Mackenzie archers to aid the Bearkillers' raid against a Protectorate castle, then force the surrender of a second castle.

Juniper gives birth to a son named Rudi in memory of her late handfasted man. During Rudi's wiccaning, Juniper is overcome by inspiration, causing her to give Rudi the craft name of Artos, proclaiming a prophecy declaring him "the Sword of the Lady."

Characters

Literary significance and reception
Author Paul Di Filippo praised the novel: "Post-apocalypse novels often veer either too heavily into romantic Robinsonades or nihilistic dead ends. But Stirling [has] the perfect balance between grit and glory."  Filippo also complimented Stirling on his characterization, and ability to "make all his retro-tech plausible, easily visualizable, and interesting."  The review on Scifidimensions called the novel "highly entertaining" and complimented Stirling on creating "novel premises, memorable characters, and hard to put down storytelling." Mel Odom gave a positive review of the novel, and the fact Mike and Juniper were imperfect heroes made them likable. He was pleased with the way Stirling worked in various themes from myths and legends into the story.  Kel Munger from the Sacramento News and Review called the novel the "Best. Apocalyptic. Novel. Ever."

Some reviewers commented on the large amount of research. Thomas M. Wagner of SF Reviews.Net said Dies the Fire is "intelligent, meticulously crafted, but overlong and sometimes pokey end-of-the-world epic." He complimented Stirling on his research, and said he was the one "the government needed to send to New Orleans to singlehandedly feed and rescue hurricane survivors." Although details drag, it is a good read for those fans of "character-driven SF and fantasy epics." Wagner although thought the novel would be stronger if Arminger played a larger role. Raymond Camden, although he recommended the novel, thought details detracted from the story.

SF Reviews called it a brilliantly-done post-disaster novel, but is more fantasy than science fiction.  The review on SF Crowsnest called the opening of the book exciting as the reader follows Clan Mackenzie and the Bearkillers after the Change, although the ending dragged.

There were negative reviews on the book. Danny Sullivan called the novel  "grating" and "too forced to be that enjoyable." He also thought it implausible for the main characters to be so lucky in a disaster on the scale of The Change. Dan Rahmel described the characters as unrealistic, and says the novel has too many improbabilities.

References to other works
 Characters and symbols from The Lord of the Rings by J. R. R. Tolkien, are mentioned throughout the novel:
 Astrid, obsessed with the stories, often compares events after The Change to events in the books.
 Lord Protector Arminger adopts the Eye of Sauron as the symbol of the Portland Protective Association.
 The Bearkillers borrow from Robert Jordan's The Wheel of Time series, among other contemporary works of fiction, for their A-Lister oath.
 Lyrics to some of Juniper Mackenzie's songs quoted in the books are Heather Alexander's; Alexander is credited in the acknowledgments of The Protector's War.
 Sutterdown and the Brannigan family are references to Brannigan's Special Ale, by Heather Alexander.
 Stirling's depiction of feudalism after The Change is similar to Poul Anderson's novella No Truce with Kings.
 There is a reference in the novel to David Brin's The Postman.
 Lines and phrases from singer-songwriter Stan Rogers are worked into the text, e.g. "You never had to tell him twice or find him work to do" from White Squall.
 "The Change" is similar to the phenomenon described in Steve Boyett's 1983 novel: Ariel: A Book of the Change.
 Lady Juniper's off-sider Aylward speaks of a fellow called Willie, operator of a pub called The Treadmill, speaks of Willie's friend although she is not named, she is Modesty Blaise.  This is an homage to Peter O'Donnell's Modesty Blaise series of books.
 premises of the novel are similar to the events described in René Barjavel's 1943 novel Ashes, Ashes.

References in other works
While reviewing the 2008 remake of The Day the Earth Stood Still, John Birmingham made reference to Dies the Fire when lambasting the ending:

Has he not read Steve Stirling's Dies the Fire series? If you want to destroy humanity you take away our batteries. We are an energy based civilization and without it we cannot survive. Within two weeks of the last minutes of that film, Connelly and her little ragamuffin adoptive son would be dead of either starvation or murder at the hands of similarly starving gangs in Manhattan. The same process would repeat itself over and over across the entire world. And what do these stupid advanced super intelligent aliens think we'd do then? Turn all hippy and tree huggy?

See also

One Second After

References

External links
 Sample Chapters
 Maps and Links for Dies the Fire
 12 Second Book Review of Dies the Fire on 12seconds.tv
 Dies the Fire on Google books

The Emberverse series
2004 American novels
2004 science fiction novels
American post-apocalyptic novels
Novels about cannibalism
Novels by S. M. Stirling
Novels set in Oregon
Roc Books books